The Nagore Durgha (or Nagore Dargah) is a shrine in Singapore built by Muslims from southern India between 1828 and 1830, and was originally known as Shahul Hamid Dargha. When this shrine was first built, Telok Ayer Street where the shrine is located was a sandy beach crowded with sailing craft. While its physical surroundings have changed beyond recognition, the monument itself – save for conservation and preservation work in 2007 – has changed little since the late 19th century. It has a unique blend of Classical and Indian Muslim motifs.

History

Nagore Durgha was built to commemorate a visit to the island by a Muslim holy man of the Chulia people (Muslims from India's Coromandel Coast), who was travelling around Southeast Asia propagating the teachings of Islam. The land on which the shrine stands was granted to a certain man named Kaderpillai in 1827 on condition that it was not to be used for a building of wood and attap.

In 1893, by an order of court, the Nagore Durgha property came under new trustees who were also appointed for the Masjid Al-Abrar. The building resembles a multi-tiered wedding cake, its sharp arches decorated with intricate moldings. The architectural features of the building blend classical motifs like moulded arches and columns with Indian Muslim elements such as perforated grilles at the roof. In 1974, it was gazetted a national monument.

The shrine was closed in the 1990s due to fears that the structure would weaken. Restoration works to turn the shrine into an Indian Muslim heritage centre started in January 2007 and were due to be completed in the fourth quarter of the same year at a cost of S$1.8 million. President S. R. Nathan attended a fund-raising event organised by Indian Muslims on 3 December 2006; at that time, the community had raised $200,000.

Architecture
The most interesting visual feature of Nagore Durgha is its facade: two arched windows flank an arched doorway, with columns in between. Above these is a "miniature palace" – a massive replica of the facade of a palace, with tiny cutout windows and a small arched doorway in the middle. The cutouts in white plaster make the facade look like lace. From the corners of the facade, two 14-level minarets rise, with three little domed cutouts on each level and onion domes on top. Inside, the prayer halls and two shrines are painted and decorated in bright colours.

References

Further reading
.
.

External links

Singapore Nagore Dargah – A Sacred Space to Celebrate Islamic Spirituality
Official website of Nagore Dargah, Singapore (www.ndsociety.sg)

Religious buildings and structures completed in 1830
Chinatown, Singapore
Ethnic museums in Singapore
Islam in Singapore
National monuments of Singapore
Outram, Singapore
Religious museums in Singapore
Religious buildings and structures in Singapore
1830 establishments in the British Empire
Islamic shrines
19th-century architecture in Singapore